Wycombe Abbey is an independent girls' boarding and day school in High Wycombe, Buckinghamshire, England. It is consistently ranked as one of the top all-girls schools in academic results.

The school was founded in 1896 by Dame Frances Dove (1847–1942), who was previously headmistress of St Leonards School in Scotland. Its present capacity is approximately 650 girls, aged 11 to 18. The current headmistress is Jo Duncan.

The school is on a 69 hectare campus in central High Wycombe. The land includes woods, gardens, a Cold War bunker (RAF Daws Hill) and a lake, and rises up to 150 metres above sea level in the Chiltern Hills. The freehold is owned by the school; the main house and several buildings at Wycombe Abbey are Grade II* listed.

History

Early history

In the 13th century, the area, with the parish church, was part of the holding of the Abbess of Godstow. 600 years later, the priory at Godstowe was also re-founded as a school by Dame Frances Dove, and today is a 'feeder' preparatory school for Wycombe Abbey.

On the site of the present Wycombe Abbey was a large manor house known as 'Loakes House' which was the seat of the Archdale family, until 1700, when Thomas Archdale sold it to Henry Petty, 1st Earl of Shelburne. The earl, in turn, bequeathed the estate to his grandnephew, William Petty, (who inherited a different Earldom of Shelburne in 1761 and became prime minister in 1782).  The Shelburnes, though, had a far larger and grander residence at Bowood House in the Savernake Forest and spent little time at Loakes House.

Consequently, Lord Shelburne sold his estates in the area.  Loakes House was purchased from them at auction by Robert Smith, 1st Baron Carrington, in 1798.  He employed the architect James Wyatt to transform Loakes House into Wycombe Abbey as we see it today. The original house and other parts of the school are listed Grade II* on the National Heritage List for England with the landscaped grounds of the school listed Grade II on the Register of Historic Parks and Gardens.

World War II
The Air Ministry requisitioned Wycombe Abbey School in March 1942 to serve as the headquarters of the United States Eighth Air Force after the entry of the United States into World War II. It was returned to Wycombe Abbey on 9 May 1946.

Houses
As at most independent schools, the pupils are placed in houses. The houses at Wycombe Abbey are: Airlie, Barry, Butler, Campbell, Cloister, Pitt, Rubens, Shelburne and Wendover. Girls in UVI live in Clarence, while the junior-most girls, UIIIs, live in Junior House. Every house at Wycombe Abbey is linked to a colour and, as part of the school uniform, girls wear ties which correspond to their House colour i.e., sky blue – Barry, green – Cloister, brown – Airlie, pink – Rubens, yellow – Pitt, orange – Butler, purple – Campbell, dark blue – Shelburne, red – Wendover, lavender – Junior. Each girl has her own 'House Mother', a girl in the year above in the same house who looks after her, particularly when new to the school. Each house has a housemistress and matrons.

Notable alumnae (Wycombe Abbey Seniors)

Rosie Alison, producer and writer
Eve Best, actress
Elsie Bowerman, suffragette, Titanic survivor and lawyer
Kate Brooke, screenwriter
Dame Elizabeth Butler-Sloss, British judge, Deputy Coroner of the Queen's Household
Sue Carr, Lady Justice of Appeal
Judith Chaplin, Member of Parliament (1992)
Lorraine Copeland, archaeologist
Gabrielle Drake, actress
Penelope Fitzgerald, novelist and biographer
Jackie Forster, actress, TV personality, feminist and lesbian campaigner
Elizabeth Haysom, orchestrated the double murder of her parents
Molly Hide, English cricketer
Lady Patricia Ann Hopkins, architect
Elspeth Howe, Baroness Howe of Idlicote
India Knight, journalist
Dorothy Lamb, archaeologist
Beverley Lang, Justice of the High Court
Fiona MacCarthy, biographer and cultural historian
Diana Magnay, journalist
Charlotte Moore, BBC's Director of Content
Florence Nagle, trainer and breeder of racehorses, breeder of pedigree dogs, feminist
Melanie Nakhla, soprano 2 in classical crossover group All Angels
Winifred Peck (née Knox), English author
Sally Phillips, actress
Joan Riviere, psychoanalyst
Merryn Somerset Webb, editor in chief of MoneyWeek
Sarah Springman, CBE FREng, engineer and sportswoman, rector of ETH Zurich
Polly Stenham, playwright
Rachael Stirling, actress
Lady "Red Jessie" Street, Australian suffragette, social reformer and founding United Nations envoy 
Florence Temko, origami pioneer and author
Mary Wakefield, journalist
Sonya Walger, actress
Lady Charlotte Wellesley, socialite and producer
Kathy Wilkes, philosopher
Lady Nicholas Windsor, wife of Lord Nicholas Windsor
Clarissa Ward, chief international correspondent for CNN

Notable staff
Margaret Boyd, physical education teacher.
Mary Cartwright
Gustav Holst
Annie Whitelaw, Head from 1910 to 1925
Elsie Bowerman, governor and school historian

References

Further reading
 Elsie Bowerman Stands there a School – Memories of Dame Frances Dove, D.B.E., Founder of Wycombe Abbey School (1965)
 Wycombe Abbey School 1896–1986: A partial history (1989)

External links
Wycombe Abbey official website
Profile on the ISC website
Wycombe Abbey: British International School in Hong Kong official website

1896 establishments in England
Educational institutions established in 1896
Boarding schools in Buckinghamshire
Private schools in Buckinghamshire
Girls' schools in Buckinghamshire
Houses in Buckinghamshire
 
Member schools of the Girls' Schools Association
Gardens by Capability Brown
Grade II* listed buildings in Buckinghamshire
Grade II listed parks and gardens in Buckinghamshire
High Wycombe